The Disney Renaissance was the period from 1989 to 1999 during which Walt Disney Feature Animation returned to producing critically and commercially successful animated films that were mostly musical adaptations of well-known stories, much as the studio did during the era of Walt Disney during the 1930s to 1960s. The resurgence allowed Disney's animated films to become a powerhouse of successes at the domestic and foreign box office, earning much greater profits than most of the Disney films of previous eras.

The animated films released by Disney during this period are The Little Mermaid (1989), The Rescuers Down Under (1990), Beauty and the Beast (1991), Aladdin (1992), The Lion King (1994), Pocahontas (1995), The Hunchback of Notre Dame (1996), Hercules (1997), Mulan (1998), and Tarzan (1999).

Background (pre-1989) 

After the deaths of Walt and Roy O. Disney (in 1966 and 1971, respectively), Walt Disney Productions were left in the hands of Donn Tatum, Card Walker, and Walt's son-in-law Ron Miller. While critics and audiences alike awaited the birth of a new golden age for Disney animation after The Rescuers (1977), the films released over an 18-year period following this change of management did not perform as well commercially as their prior counterparts. An especially hard blow was dealt during production of The Fox and the Hound (1981), when long-time animator Don Bluth left Disney's animation department to start his own rival studio, Don Bluth Productions, taking eleven Disney animators with him. With 17% of the animators now gone, production on The Fox and the Hound was delayed by six months. Don Bluth Productions produced The Secret of NIMH (1982), whose story had originally been rejected by Disney for being too dark, and the company eventually became Disney's main competitor in the animation industry during the 1980s and early 1990s.

Disney made major organizational changes in the mid-1980s after narrowly escaping a hostile takeover attempt by businessman and financier Saul Steinberg. Michael Eisner, formerly of Paramount Pictures, became CEO in 1984, and was joined by his Paramount associate Jeffrey Katzenberg as studio chairman, while Frank Wells, formerly of Warner Bros. Pictures, became president. In 1985, Peter Schneider was hired as president of Disney's feature animation department, which was soon to be rebranded as Walt Disney Feature Animation. Thus, most of the Disney Renaissance (in terms of where the films were actually made) actually took place in a rather ordinary industrial park in Glendale, the Grand Central Business Centre.

After the box office failure of the PG-rated The Black Cauldron (1985), the future of the animation department was in jeopardy. Going against a 30-year studio policy, the company founded a television animation division (now Disney Television Animation), which produced such shows as DuckTales. In the interest of saving what he believed to be the studio's core business, Roy E. Disney, who resigned from the company in 1984, persuaded Eisner to let him return and supervise the animation department in the hopes of improving its fortunes.

1986–1988: The Great Mouse Detective, Disney vs. Don Bluth, Hayao Miyazaki's influence, and Oliver and Company 
Disney released The Great Mouse Detective (1986) a few months before Don Bluth released An American Tail (1986). An American Tail outperformed The Great Mouse Detective and became the highest grossing animated film to that date. Despite An American Tails greater level of success, The Great Mouse Detective was still successful enough (both critically and commercially) to instill executive confidence in Disney's animation department. Oliver and Company (1988) would later be released on the same day as The Land Before Time (1988). Despite The Land Before Time becoming globally the highest grossing animated film to that date, breaking the previous record of An American Tail, Oliver and Company outgrossed it in the United States, launching an era of increased theatrical turnout for Disney.

In the 1980s, Disney collaborated with filmmaker Steven Spielberg—producer of An American Tail and The Land Before Time and a long-time animation fan—to produce Who Framed Roger Rabbit (1988), a live-action/animation hybrid that featured animated characters of the 1930s and 1940s from many different studios together. The film was a critical and commercial success, winning three Academy Awards as well as a Special Achievement Academy Award, and renewing interest in theatrical animated cartoons. In addition to the film itself, Spielberg also helped Disney produce three Roger Rabbit shorts. Disney moved to first place in box office receipts by 1988, with Who Framed Roger Rabbit being the summer's biggest hit.

The Disney Renaissance was prompted by competition with Don Bluth's animated productions, along with the evolution of overseas animation, most notably the Studio Ghibli anime productions from Japanese animator Hayao Miyazaki. His Lupin the Third film adaptation, Castle of Cagliostro (1979), influenced the climax of The Great Mouse Detective, which in turn paved the way for the Disney Renaissance. The two-minute climax scene used computer-generated imagery (CGI), making it the first Disney film to extensively use computer animation, a fact that Disney used to promote the film during marketing. Glen Keane, a leading animator for Disney films, has also credited Miyazaki's work as a "huge influence" on Disney's animated films.

Timeline (1989–1999)

1989: The Little Mermaid 
Disney had been developing The Little Mermaid (1989) since the 1930s, and by 1988, after the success of Touchstone Pictures' Who Framed Roger Rabbit, the studio had decided to make it into an animated musical, much like many of its previous animated movies, but with a more Broadway feel to it. Lyricist Howard Ashman and composer Alan Menken, who worked on Broadway years earlier on Little Shop of Horrors alongside now-Walt Disney Feature Animation president Peter Schneider (who served as company manager on the stage musical), became involved in the production, writing and composing the songs and score for the film.

Upon release, The Little Mermaid was a critical and commercial success and garnered a higher weekend gross than Don Bluth's All Dogs Go to Heaven (1989), which was released on the same day, eventually breaking The Land Before Times record of highest-grossing animated film.

It won two Academy Awards for Best Original Song ("Under the Sea") and for Best Original Score, earning an additional nomination for Best Original Song for "Kiss the Girl".

1990–1991: The Rescuers Down Under and Beauty and the Beast 
The Rescuers Down Under (1990) was released as the first sequel produced by Walt Disney Feature Animation. The film garnered mainly positive reception, but was not as financially successful as The Little Mermaid.  However, it was notable for being the first film to be completely produced using Disney's new Computer Animation Production System (CAPS). The rest of the traditionally-animated films during this period would be produced using CAPS.

Beauty and the Beast (1991) was Disney's next film and proved to be an immense critical and commercial success. It was the first animated film nominated for an Academy Award for Best Picture, remaining the only animated film nominated for Best Picture when that category had only five entries (1944–2008), and won the Golden Globe Award for Best Picture (Musical or Comedy) and two Academy Awards, for Best Original Score and Best Original Song ("Beauty and the Beast"). Beauty and the Beast also received an Academy Award nomination for Best Sound, as well as two additional nominations for Best Original Song. In addition to being Disney's highest grossing animated movie at the time, it was the first animated film to reach $100 million at the box office in the U.S. The box office success also gave way to a profitable merchandising campaign. In 1994, it was the first Disney Renaissance film to receive a Broadway adaptation.

1992–1994: Aladdin and The Lion King 
Aladdin (1992) and The Lion King (1994) followed, respectively, with both films having the highest worldwide grosses of their respective release years. Aladdin was the highest-grossing animated film at the time of its release, but later became second after being surpassed by The Lion King, which became the highest-grossing animated film at the time and remains the highest-grossing traditionally animated film in history.

Howard Ashman wrote several songs for Aladdin before his death, but only three were ultimately used in the film. Tim Rice ultimately joined the project and completed the score and songs with Alan Menken. Rice later went on to collaborate with Elton John and Hans Zimmer for The Lion King after ABBA had turned down the offer to write songs for the film. Both films won Academy Awards for Best Original Song ("Can You Feel the Love Tonight") and Best Original Score, and also like Beauty and the Beast won the Golden Globe Award for Best Picture (Musical or Comedy). Aladdin also earned an additional Academy Award nomination for Best Original Song and nominations for Best Sound and Best Sound Effects Editing, for a total of five nominations. The Lion King earned two additional Academy Award nominations for Best Original Song, giving it a total of four Academy Award nominations.

Between the two in-house productions, Disney diversified in animation methods and produced the stop-motion animated film The Nightmare Before Christmas (1993) with former Disney animator Tim Burton, which was directed by also former Disney animator Henry Selick. Thanks to the success of the early films of the Renaissance era, Disney management was able to allocate sufficient money to bring Feature Animation back from its ten-year exile to Glendale. A 240,000-square-foot building designed by Robert A. M. Stern opened across the street from the main Disney lot in Burbank on December 16, 1994.

1995–1997: Pocahontas, The Hunchback of Notre Dame, and Hercules 
The next Disney animated film, Pocahontas (1995), opened to mixed reviews, though it still earned $346 million worldwide and garnered two Academy Awards for Best Original Musical or Comedy Score and Best Original Song ("Colors of the Wind"). However, its box office gross was far lower in comparison to what The Lion King earned the previous year. The following year, The Hunchback of Notre Dame (1996), Disney's first animated film produced at a budget over $100 million, opened to better reviews than Pocahontas, but a lower total box office of $325 million. Both films feature composer (now serving only as lyricist to Menken's music) Stephen Schwartz.

When Hercules (1997), with songs by Menken and David Zippel, earned $252 million—$73 million less than The Hunchback of Notre Dame—at the box office, news media began to openly suggest that Disney animation was on a downward trend of their animated film releases. Although it gained more positive criticism than Pocahontas and The Hunchback of Notre Dame, it was still vulnerable to competition from companies such as DreamWorks Animation and Pixar.

1998–1999: Mulan and Tarzan
Disney's next film, Mulan (1998), with a score by Jerry Goldsmith and songs by Matthew Wilder and David Zippel, earned $304 million at the worldwide box office, restoring the commercial and critical standing of Disney's output.

The release of Tarzan (1999) is retrospectively seen as the end of the Renaissance era. With a score by Mark Mancina and songs by Phil Collins, Tarzan won an Academy Award for Best Original Song ("You'll Be in My Heart"), and became Disney's most commercially successful film since The Lion King, earning $448 million at the box office and widespread positive reviews. Tarzan was also Disney's most expensive animated feature to that date at $130 million, much of which went to developing new processes such as the computer-assisted background painting technique known as "Deep Canvas". It was also the first film since the start of the Renaissance era that was written, developed, and produced at the studio's new home in Burbank; all the other films had either been made entirely in Glendale or had started development in Glendale and moved with the studio to Burbank.

Reception

Critical and public response 
Most of the films Disney released in the Renaissance era were well-received. According to review-aggregation website Rotten Tomatoes, six of the movies—The Little Mermaid, Beauty and the Beast, Aladdin, The Lion King, Mulan and Tarzan garnered approval ratings of over 85%, with the first four being referred to by Roger Ebert as the "big four". Pocahontas has the lowest reception of Disney's Renaissance films - it averaged 55% positive reviews.

Box office performance 

List indicator(s)
 (A) indicates the adjusted totals based on current ticket prices (calculated by Box Office Mojo).

Awards 

Nine of the ten films in the Disney Renaissance were nominated for Academy Awards, six of which won at least one Academy Award; six Best Original Song and five Best Original Score, with the first five films won awards in both categories. The Disney Renaissance is also notable for being its film Beauty and the Beast became the first animated film ever to be nominated for Best Picture. Nine of the films were nominated for Annie Awards, with eight of them winning at least one:

Music

Soundtracks 
All soundtracks were initially released under Walt Disney Records in the format of CD and cassette.

Singles

Analysis 
Many have attributed the success of the Disney Renaissance to a collection of key similarities found in most if not all of the films from 1989 to 1999. Broadway-style musical numbers were put into place that forwarded the narrative of each film. Characters used songs to showcase their internal emotions. Most of the Renaissance films had songs that have the main character singing what they want out of life as well as chorus numbers led by the supporting cast. Critics have also said that the music style of Renaissance films varies from film to film. An example would be The Little Mermaid having Calypso-style musical numbers and Hercules utilizing Motown in its soundtrack.

The use of CAPS, action sequences, and inclusion of celebrity voice talent is also said to have drawn audiences in. Robin Williams' performance as Genie in Aladdin is the reason why many believe other studios began to cast celebrities as voice actors in their animated films.

Due to Disney never acknowledging an official timeline of films for their Renaissance, it is debated what film should be considered the end of the era. Some consider Dinosaur (2000) for its use of CGI or The Emperor's New Groove (2000) for its comedic tone to be the end of the Renaissance. Given its release in 1999, Fantasia 2000 is included in the line-up of films if either Dinosaur or The Emperor's New Groove is seen as the end of the era. Brandon Zachery of Comic Book Resources states that Tarzan is widely considered to be the finale of the Renaissance as it was the final film in a row of Disney's that, "still adhered to many of the era's standard traits, including multiple songs, cutting-edge visuals and celebrity cameos in small roles."

Sequels 
Disney MovieToons, later known as Disneytoon Studios, was established by Disney to produce direct-to-video sequels to many of the Renaissance films utilizing the crew of their television animation studios. The Return of Jafar (1994), a sequel to Aladdin, was the first film to be released. Further sequels to Renaissance films include Beauty and the Beast: The Enchanted Christmas (1997), Pocahontas II: Journey to a New World (1998), The Lion King II: Simba's Pride (1998), The Little Mermaid II: Return to the Sea (2000), The Hunchback of Notre Dame II (2002), Mulan II (2004) and Tarzan II (2005).

Impact on other studios 
The success of the Disney Renaissance attracted the attention of many animation studios and film studios. Major film studios established new animation divisions such as Fox Animation Studios, Warner Bros. Feature Animation and DreamWorks Animation to replicate Disney's success by turning their animated films into Disney-styled musicals. Examples of said musicals include Cats Don't Dance (1997), Anastasia (1997), Quest for Camelot (1998), and The Prince of Egypt (1998).

Impact on the company (2009–present) 
Many have hailed Walt Disney Animation Studios’ theatrical film releases from 2009 to onward as a return to form, referring to this era in Disney history as the Disney Revival or even the new Disney Renaissance. Most films in the Revival use CGI animation to tell stories set in fantastical settings incorporating the Renaissance’s Broadway musical style. Several crew members from the Renaissance returned to help create Revival films. Ron Clements and John Musker returned to direct The Princess and the Frog (2009) and Moana (2016). Alan Menken scored Tangled (2010) and was a songwriter for Ralph Breaks the Internet (2018).

The Disney Revival is the most profitable era in Disney animation history. Frozen, for instance, grossed over 1.2 billion worldwide. The film held the title of highest-grossing animated film, fifth-highest-grossing film of all time, and third highest-grossing Walt Disney Pictures film of all time in 2013. Frozen also was Walt Disney Animation Studios' first feature-length motion picture to win an Academy Award since Tarzan.

Remakes 
Beauty and the Beast, directed by Bill Condon, was released on March 17, 2017 as the first live-action adaptation of the Disney Renaissance. Alan Menken returned for writing a new score and new songs with Tim Rice. The film grossed over $1.2 billion worldwide, becoming the highest-grossing live-action musical film, second-highest-grossing film of 2017, and the tenth-highest-grossing film of all time. Beauty and the Beast received generally positive reviews from critics, with many praising its faithfulness to the original animated film, as well as elements from the Broadway musical, performances of the cast, visual style, musical score, songs, costume design, and production values, though criticism was drawn toward some of the character designs and its excessive similarity to the original.

Aladdin, directed and co-written by Guy Ritchie, is the second live-action Disney Renaissance adaptation theatrically released in the United States on May 24, 2019. Alan Menken returned again to write new music and songs with Benj Pasek and Justin Paul. It grossed $1 billion worldwide, becoming the ninth-highest-grossing film of 2019. The film received mixed reviews from critics, with praise for its music, costume design, and the performances of actors, but criticism for Ritchie's direction and the screenplay.

The third live-action Disney Renaissance remake became CGI remake The Lion King (directed and produced by Jon Favreau). It was theatrically released in the United States on July 19, 2019. Hans Zimmer returned as composer, and Elton John and Tim Rice returned to write new songs with Beyoncé. It grossed over $1.6 billion worldwide, becoming highest-grossing animated film of all time, the highest-grossing musical film of all time, the highest-grossing remake of all time, the highest-grossing Walt Disney Pictures film of all time, the second-highest-grossing film of 2019, and the seventh highest-grossing film of all time. The film received mixed reviews from critics, with praise for its visual effects, music, and vocal performances, but criticism for its lack of originality, and facial emotion on the characters.

The fourth live-action adaptation, Mulan, was released on September 4, 2020. It was directed by Niki Caro with Harry Gregson-Williams acting as the new composer and songwriter for the film. Originally scheduled to be a wide theatrical release in March 2020, it was ultimately cancelled in the United States after being delayed multiple times due to the COVID-19 pandemic. Disney instead premiered the film on September 4, 2020 on Disney+, for a premium fee in countries where the service had launched. The film had a traditional theatrical release in countries without Disney+ where theaters have re-opened. With a production budget of $200 million, the film was a financial disappointment (partially due to the pandemic), grossing only $70 million, not including digital earnings from Disney+. The film received generally positive reviews from western critics, who praised the action sequences, visuals, and performances but criticized the screenplay. It received unfavorable reviews from Chinese audiences, who criticized the character development, inaccurate depictions of Chinese history and mishandling of Chinese cultural elements.

The Little Mermaid is the upcoming fifth remake from the Disney Renaissance. Directed and produced by Rob Marshall, it is set to be released on May 26, 2023. Alan Menken also returns as the film's composer and will write new songs alongside producer Lin-Manuel Miranda.

Live-action adaptations of The Hunchback of Notre Dame and Hercules are currently in development, with the latter being directed by Guy Ritchie.

Video games 
Disney Interactive Studios, the video game company who creating video games based on the Disney Renaissance films, The Little Mermaid (1991), Aladdin (1993), Beauty and the Beast (1994), The Lion King (1994), Pocahontas (1996), The Hunchback of Notre Dame: Topsy Turvy Games (1996), Hercules (1997), Mulan (1998) and Tarzan (1999).

See also 
 Waking Sleeping Beauty – 2009 documentary film chronicling the beginning and success of the Disney Renaissance from 1984 to 1994.

References

External links 
 Decent Films: Notes on the End of the Disney Renaissance
 Disney Animated Film List

 
1980s in film
1990s in film
2000s in film
American animated films
Disney animation
Disney jargon
Golden ages (metaphor)
1980s in American cinema
1990s in American cinema
2000s in American cinema
History of animation
History of The Walt Disney Company